Sir Ignatius Kilage  (12 July 1941 – 31 December 1989) was a Papua New Guinean politician who served as the fourth governor-general of Papua New Guinea from March to December 1989, when he died suddenly in office.

Prior to the vice regal post, Kilage was chief ombudsman of Papua New Guinea and author of the book My Mother Calls Me Yaltep.

After his death, a stadium was named in his honour in 1991.

References 

1941 births
1989 deaths
Governors-General of Papua New Guinea
Knights Grand Cross of the Order of St Michael and St George
Chief Ombudsmen of Papua New Guinea
Papua New Guinean writers